Lawrence Gene David (born July 2, 1947) is an American comedian, writer, actor, and television producer. He and Jerry Seinfeld created the television sitcom Seinfeld, on which David was head writer and executive producer for the first seven seasons. He gained further recognition for the HBO series Curb Your Enthusiasm, which he created and stars in as a fictionalized version of himself. He has written or co-written the story of every episode since its pilot episode in 1999.

David's work on Seinfeld won him two Primetime Emmy Awards in 1993, for Outstanding Comedy Series and Outstanding Individual Achievement in Writing in a Comedy Series. Formerly a comedian, he went into television comedy, writing and starring in ABC's Fridays, and writing briefly for Saturday Night Live. He has been nominated for 27 Primetime Emmy Awards and three Golden Globe Awards. He was voted by fellow comedians and comedy insiders as the 23rd greatest comedy star ever in a 2004 British poll to select "The Comedian's Comedian", and received the Laurel Award for TV Writing Achievement by the Writers Guild of America in 2010.

Since 2015, he has made recurring guest appearances on Saturday Night Live, where he impersonates 2016 and 2020 U.S. presidential candidate Bernie Sanders, who is also his sixth cousin once removed.

Early life and family
Lawrence Gene David was born on July 2, 1947 in the Sheepshead Bay neighborhood of Brooklyn, New York City. His parents are Rose and Mortimer Julius "Morty" David, a men's clothing manufacturer, and he has an older brother named Ken. David's family is Jewish. His father's side moved from Germany to the U.S. during the 19th century, while David's mother was born into a Polish-Jewish family in Ternopil, now in Ukraine. His German-Jewish great-grandfather from Mobile, Alabama, fought for the Confederacy during the Civil War and owned two enslaved children.

David graduated from Sheepshead Bay High School (now defunct) in 1965. A sign with his photo was displayed in one of the hallways at the school. He then attended the University of Maryland, College Park, where he was a brother in Tau Epsilon Phi. He graduated in 1970 with a Bachelor of Arts in history. At college, he discovered that he could make people laugh simply by being himself. After college, David enlisted in the United States Army Reserve for five years.

Career

Stand-up and SNL 
While a stand-up comedian, David also worked as a store clerk, limousine driver, and historian. He lived in Manhattan Plaza, a federally subsidized housing complex in the Hell's Kitchen neighborhood of Manhattan, across the hall from Kenny Kramer, the inspiration for the Cosmo Kramer character in Seinfeld. From 1980 to 1982, David became a writer and cast member for ABC's Fridays where he worked with Michael Richards (Kramer).

From 1984 to 1985 he was a writer for NBC's Saturday Night Live (SNL) and met Julia Louis-Dreyfus who also worked on the show in this period. During his time at SNL, he was able to get only one sketch on the show, which aired at 12:50 am, the last time slot on the show. David quit his writing job at SNL in the first season, only to show up to work two days later acting as though nothing had happened. That event inspired a second-season episode of Seinfeld titled "The Revenge". He can be heard heckling Michael McKean when McKean hosted SNL in 1984, and he can be seen in the sketch "The Run, Throw, and Catch Like a Girl Olympics" when Howard Cosell hosted the season finale in 1985.

In 1987, David was a writer and performer for Way Off Broadway, a variety talk show on Lifetime hosted by Joy Behar.

Seinfeld
In 1989, David teamed up with comedian Jerry Seinfeld to create a pilot for NBC called The Seinfeld Chronicles, which became the basis for Seinfeld, one of the most successful shows in history, reaching the top of TV Guide list of the 50 greatest TV shows of all time. Entertainment Weekly ranked it the third-best TV show of all time. David made occasional uncredited appearances on the show, playing such roles as Frank Costanza's cape-wearing lawyer and the voice of George Steinbrenner. He was also the primary inspiration for the show's character George Costanza. David left Seinfeld on friendly terms after the seventh season but returned to write the series finale in 1998, two years later. He also continued to provide the voice for the Steinbrenner character.

David wrote 62 of the episodes of Seinfeld, including 1992's "The Contest", for which he won a Primetime Emmy Award and which TV Guide ranked as episode  1 on its list of "TV's Top 100 Episodes of All Time". The syndication of Seinfeld earned David an estimated $250 million in 1998 alone. This amount has been steadily decreasing each year, but payments will continue until the full $1.7 billion from the original syndication deal has been paid. In 2008, David made $55 million from Seinfeld syndication, DVD sales, and Curb Your Enthusiasm. He was nominated for an Emmy award 19 times for Seinfeld, winning twice — once for best comedy and once for writing.

Curb Your Enthusiasm

The HBO cable television channel aired David's one-hour special, Larry David: Curb Your Enthusiasm, on October 17, 1999. This was followed by Curb Your Enthusiasm, a television series on HBO that aired its first episode on October 15, 2000. The show revisits many of the themes of Seinfeld, and is improvised from a story outline only several pages long that David writes (as of the 5th season, additional writers were hired).

The actors improvise their dialogue based on the story outline, direction, and their creativity. David has said that his character in the show, a fictionalized version of himself, is what he would be like in real life if he lacked social awareness and sensitivity. The character's numerous and frequent social faux pas, misunderstandings, and ironic coincidences are the basis of much of the show's comedy and have led to the entry into the American pop culture lexicon of the expression "Larry David moment", meaning an inadvertently created socially awkward situation.

The basis of the show is the events in David's life following the fortune he earned from the Seinfeld series; David, semi-retired, strives to live a fulfilled life. Alongside David is his wife Cheryl (played by Cheryl Hines), his manager and best friend Jeff (played by Jeff Garlin), and Jeff's wife Susie (played by Susie Essman).

Celebrities, including comedians Richard Lewis, Wanda Sykes, and Bob Einstein appeared on the show regularly. Actors Ted Danson and Mary Steenburgen have had recurring roles as themselves.

The show is critically acclaimed and has been nominated for 30 Primetime Emmy Awards, with one win, as well as one Golden Globe win. In the first six seasons, Julia Louis-Dreyfus and Jason Alexander appeared in several episodes, and Jerry Seinfeld made a cameo. In season 7, the cast of Seinfeld, including Michael Richards, returned in a story arc involving David's attempt to organize a Seinfeld reunion special.

On Wednesday, June 2, 2010, the series premiered on the TV Guide Network, making its network television debut. TV Guide Network also produced a series of related discussions with high-profile guest stars, media pundits, and prominent social figures called "Curb: The Discussion" debating the moral implications depicted in each episode. David is quoted as saying "Finally, thanks to the TV Guide Network, I'll get a chance to watch actual, intelligent people discuss and debate the issues addressed on 'Curb'. Now if only someone could tell me where this alleged 'Network' is, I might even watch it." The show's 11th season premiered in 2021.

Other projects
David has also been involved in other films and television series. David wrote and directed the 1998 film Sour Grapes, about two cousins who feud over a casino jackpot. It was neither a commercial nor a critical success.

David also has appeared in bit roles in Woody Allen's Radio Days (1987) and New York Stories (1989), before taking the leading role in Allen's New York-based comedy film Whatever Works (2009) alongside Evan Rachel Wood.

David had a cameo appearance on the HBO series Entourage as a client of Ari Gold, and because his daughters were Hannah Montana fans, David, along with his daughters, guest-starred, as themselves, in the episode "My Best Friend's Boyfriend", in which they were waiting for a table at a fancy restaurant.

David appeared as a panelist on the NBC series The Marriage Ref and also played Sister Mary-Mengele in the 2012 reboot of The Three Stooges. David co-wrote and starred in the 2013 HBO television film Clear History.

David wrote and starred in the Broadway play Fish in the Dark. Also appearing were Rita Wilson, Jayne Houdyshell, and Rosie Perez. The play centers on the death of a family patriarch. It opened on March 5, 2015. Jason Alexander took over David's role in July. The play closed in August. As of February 1, 2015, its advance sale of $13.5 million had broken records for a Broadway show.

David was among several celebrities who appeared in a commercial for cryptocurrency exchange FTX Trading Limited that aired on Super Bowl LVI. In November 2022, FTX filed for bankruptcy, and David, alongside other spokespeople was sued in a class-action lawsuit. In February 2022, the U.S. 11th Circuit Court of Appeals ruled in a lawsuit against Bitconnect that the Securities Act of 1933 extends to targeted solicitation using social media.

Bernie Sanders 
Since 2015, David has made multiple guest appearances portraying 2016 and 2020 United States presidential election candidate Bernie Sanders on Saturday Night Live; he also hosted the show on February 6, 2016, with musical guest The 1975 and a cameo from Sanders himself, and on November 4, 2017, with musical guest Miley Cyrus.

In the summer of 2017, PBS's Finding Your Roots discovered through genealogical research that David and Bernie Sanders are distantly related. Sanders told David the news. "I was very happy about that," David said, according to Variety. "I thought there must have been some connection." The comedian explained that Sanders is "a third cousin or something."

On January 8, 2020, David joked on The Late Show with Stephen Colbert, "I would say, I would beg him (Bernie) to drop out so I don't have to keep flying in from Los Angeles to do SNL," David answered. "I thought when he had the heart attack that would be it, I wouldn't have to fly in from Los Angeles. But, you know, he's indestructible. Nothing stops this man!" He later added, "If he wins, do you know what that's going to do to my life? Do you have any idea? I mean, it will be great for the country — great for the country. Terrible for me."

Influences 
David has named Woody Allen, Mel Brooks, Phil Silvers, Abbott and Costello, Jackie Mason, Alan King, Don Rickles and MAD Magazine as influences.

Personal life
David lives in the Pacific Palisades neighborhood of Los Angeles, California. David was married to Laurie Lennard from 1993 to 2007. They have two daughters, Cazzie David and Romy David. The Davids both became contributing bloggers at The Huffington Post in May 2005. In 2017, David was introduced to producer Ashley Underwood at a birthday party for Sacha Baron Cohen. They were married in 2020.

David is a supporter of the Democratic Party. In 2010, David wrote an article for The New York Times criticizing the extension of the Bush tax cuts for the wealthy. He ended the article with a sarcastic thank you to then-President Barack Obama for approving the tax cut extension.

David was raised Jewish and identifies as an atheist.

David is an avid sports fan, and being a native of New York supports the teams New York Jets, New York Yankees, New York Knicks, and the New York Rangers.

Wealth 
It is estimated that David's net worth is somewhere between US$400 and $900 million as of 2015. National Review estimated his net worth to be about $400 million as of 2020. Charlie Rose noted David's overall wealth as closer to $500 million in a televised statement on 60 Minutes in 2013. 

In a 2015 interview with CBS, David confirmed that half of his wealth was eroded by his 2007 divorce in the community property state of California. "I have a lot of money," David said in the interview, but also added that the "figures out there are crazy." Most of his wealth originates from syndication deals of Seinfeld and Curb Your Enthusiasm, the former netting US$3.1 billion in total re-run fees as of 2013. 

In 2008, David was reported to gross $55 million in total compensation, mostly from Seinfeld syndication and work on Curb Your Enthusiasm. His speculative net worth was parodied on "The Shrimp Incident" episode of Curb Your Enthusiasm, in which HBO executive Allan Wasserman yells at David: "If you want shrimp, take your $475 million, go buy a fucking shrimp boat."

Filmography

Film

Television

Theater

Bibliography

Awards and nominations
 Voted by fellow comedians and comedy insiders as number 23 of the greatest comedy stars ever in a poll to select The Comedian's Comedian.

Primetime Emmy Awards

References

Further reading
 The Larry David Story: A Parallel Universe Biography
 Pretty, Pretty, Pretty Good: Larry David and the Making of Seinfeld and Curb Your Enthusiasm by Josh Levine (ECW Press, 2010)

External links
 
 
 

1947 births
20th-century American comedians
20th-century American Jews
20th-century American male actors
20th-century American writers
21st-century American comedians
21st-century American Jews
21st-century American male actors
21st-century American writers
Jewish American atheists
American male comedians
American male film actors
American male screenwriters
American male television actors
American male television writers
American male voice actors
American military personnel of the Vietnam War
American people of German-Jewish descent
American people of Polish-Jewish descent
American sketch comedians
American stand-up comedians
American television writers
American Ashkenazi Jews
Comedians from New York City
Jewish American male actors
Jewish American male comedians
Jewish American military personnel
Jewish American screenwriters
Living people
Male actors from New York City
Military personnel from New York City
Military personnel from New York (state)
People from Hell's Kitchen, Manhattan
People from Sheepshead Bay, Brooklyn
Screenwriters from New York (state)
Sheepshead Bay High School alumni
Showrunners
Tau Epsilon Phi
Television producers from New York City
The New Yorker people
United States Army soldiers
University of Maryland, College Park alumni
Writers from Manhattan
Writers Guild of America Award winners
Jewish American comedy writers